The Hasbro Universe refers to several shared fictional universes featuring characters from several franchises owned by toy and entertainment company Hasbro.

List of continuities

Comics 
Earth-616 / Marvel Universe (Marvel Comics, 1979–present)
The Micronauts
Rom: Spaceknight
SpeceKnights
 Earth-91274 (Marvel Comics, 1982–1994)
G.I. Joe: A Real American Hero
The Transformers
G.I. Joe vs. The Transformers series (Image Comics and Devil's Due Publishing, 2003–2007)
G.I. Joe vs. The Transformers (2003)
G.I. Joe vs. The Transformers II (2004)
G.I. Joe vs. The Transformers III: The Art of War (2006)
G.I. Joe vs. The Transformers IV: Black Horizon (2007)
 Transformers/G.I. Joe series (2004, Dreamwave Productions)
Transformers/G.I. Joe (2004)
Transformers/G.I. Joe: Divided Front (2004)
 Hasbro Comic Book Universe (IDW Publishing, 2005–2018)
 Unit:E (HasLab, 2011, for San Diego Comic-Con)
 The Transformers vs. G.I. Joe series (IDW Publishing, 2014–2016)
 The Transformers vs. G.I. Joe (2014)
 The Transformers vs. G.I. Joe: The Movie Adaptation (2016)
 Aw Yeah Revolution! (IDW Publishing, 2017)
 "When Worlds Collide" (Grey Global Group, 2017, for HasCon)
 My Little Pony/Transformers series (IDW Publishing, 2020–2021)
 My Little Pony/Transformers: Friendship in Disguise! (2020)
My Little Pony/Transformers: The Magic of Cybertron (2021)

Film and television 

 From 1983 to 1987, Sunbow Productions and Marvel Productions developed the series G.I. Joe: A Real American Hero, The Transformers, Jem and Inhumanoids. These series had been hinted to share the same universe, mostly due to the appearance of the character named Hector Ramirez.
 The "Transformers Aligned Continuity" (comprising the animated series Transformers: Prime and Transformers: Robots in Disguise) features a reference to M.A.S.K. as a division of the United States military that developed a special vehicle.
 In 2018, a short film titled Hasbro All-Stars by Willard Appiah and Shoguns Entertainment was released. In the film, Mr. Monopoly struggles to gather his friends (from various Hasbro brands) for a yearly family photo.

Games 

 In 2023, Renegade Game Studios released a crossover event Worlds Collide: Battle for the Multiverse, uniting three role-playing games based on G.I. Joe, Transformers and Power Rangers. In the premise, the heroes and villains of those universes must confront Lord Mindwavez, an amalgam version of Doctor Mindbender, Shockwave and Lord Zedd.

Other 

 Transformers and G.I. Joe film series (cancelled)
 On March 28, 2014, producer Lorenzo di Bonaventura announced that he is open to doing a crossover film between the Transformers and G.I. Joe film series (Paramount Pictures and MGM). On June 23, di Bonaventura stated that a crossover was not likely to happen, but on July 9, he reassured there would still be a possibility. On October 23, 2015, Chu confirmed his intentions to make a crossover film between Jem (Universal Pictures) with Transformers and G.I. Joe. On October 29, he hinted about Transformers possibly doing crossovers with other Hasbro products. On January 18, 2017, D. J. Caruso has stated that when he was in talks to be GI Joe 3'''s director, the discussion included a Transformers and G.I. Joe meeting. However, Paramount did not think the time was right to do so because they did not want to infringe on Michael Bay's running of the Transformers films.
 Five-property cinematic universe (cancelled)
 On December 15, 2015, Hasbro agreed with Paramount to a deal creating a five-property movie universe by then financing unit Allspark Pictures and distributed by Paramount Pictures. This new universe would consist of the current G.I. Joe film series alongside future film adaptations based on M.A.S.K., Micronauts, Rom and Visionaries. On April 21, 2016, The Hollywood Reporter confirmed that Lindsey Beer, Michael Chabon, Cheo Hodari Coker, Joe Robert Cole, John Francis Daley, Jonathan Goldstein, Jeff Pinkner, Nicole Perlman, Nicole Riegel, Geneva Robertson and Brian K. Vaughan have joined the writers' room for the cinematic universe. In March 2021, Lorenzo di Bonaventura stated the writers' room is disbanded, leaving the project in development hell.Power Rangers film/TV universe (planned)
 On December 13, 2019, it was reported that Jonathan Entwistle is in early negotiations to direct a new Power Rangers film reboot, with Patrick Burleigh being set to write the script. The plot will reportedly involve time travel and will be set in the 1990s. On October 20, 2020, It was announced that Entwistle will work on the reboot with Hasbro and Entertainment One as he will be overseeing, and directing, both film and television adaptations and the very next week, Deadline reported that Bryan Edward Hill will write the script for the reboot.Dungeons & Dragons film/TV universe (planned)
 In February 2022, Entertainment One and Wizards of the Coast announced a new project focusing on several reboot films and television series based on Dungeons & Dragons, starting with the film Dungeons & Dragons: Honor Among Thieves'', scheduled for March 10, 2023.

See also 
 List of comics based on Hasbro properties
 List of films based on Hasbro properties
 List of television programs based on Hasbro properties

References 

Continuity (fiction)
Hasbro
Fictional universes